Manuel Francesco Manari (born 13 August 1997) is an Italian football player. He plays for Atletico Terme Fiuggi in the Serie D.

Club career
He made his Serie C debut for Juve Stabia on 19 March 2017 in a game against Cosenza.

On 28 February 2020, Manari joined ASD Torrese. Manari then moved to Serie D club Porto Sant'Elpidio on 20 September 2020. After a half season, he moved to fellow league club Castelnuovo Vomano in January 2021. He left the club again at the end of the season.

At the end of October 2021, Manari joined Delta Rovigo. On 3 January 2022, he moved to Atletico Terme Fiuggi.

References

External links
 
 

1997 births
Sportspeople from the Province of Teramo
Living people
Italian footballers
Association football midfielders
Serie C players
Serie D players
Ascoli Calcio 1898 F.C. players
S.S. Juve Stabia players
A.S. Gubbio 1910 players
Avezzano Calcio players
A.S.D. Atletico Terme Fiuggi players
Footballers from Abruzzo
A.C. Sangiustese players